Night and the City is a live album by the bassist Charlie Haden and the pianist Kenny Barron, recorded at the Iridium Jazz Club in 1996 and released on the Verve label.

Reception 
The AllMusic review by Richard S. Ginell called the album "a thoughtful, intensely musical, sometimes haunting set of performances".

Track listing 
 "Twilight Song" (Kenny Barron) - 12:47 
 "For Heaven's Sake" (Elise Bretton, Sherman Edwards, Donald Meyer) - 10:46 
 "Spring Is Here" (Lorenz Hart, Richard Rodgers) - 10:20 
 "Body and Soul" (Frank Eyton, Johnny Green, Edward Heyman, Robert Sour) - 10:25 
 "You Don't Know What Love Is" (Gene de Paul, Don Raye) - 6:59 
 "Waltz for Ruth" (Charlie Haden) - 8:27 
 "The Very Thought of You" (Ray Noble) - 11:01 
Recorded at the Iridium in New York City on September 20, 21 & 22, 1996

Personnel
Kenny Barron — piano
Charlie Haden — bass

References 

Verve Records live albums
Charlie Haden live albums
Kenny Barron live albums
Instrumental duet albums
1998 live albums